Dylan C. Penningroth is a historian and  professor at the University of California, Berkeley. In 2012, he was the recipient of a MacArthur Fellows Program grant.

Life
Penningroth received his Bachelor of Arts degree from Yale University in 1993 and his Masters (1996) and Ph.D. (2000) from Johns Hopkins University.  
His studies focus on elements of African American life under slavery and in the half-century following slavery’s abolition.

Works

References

External links 

 "Dylan C. Penningroth". Department of History at University of California, Berkeley. URL retrieved 31 July 2018.

Living people
21st-century American historians
21st-century American male writers
MacArthur Fellows
Year of birth missing (living people)
American male non-fiction writers